Ymir , or Saturn XIX, is the second-largest retrograde irregular moon of Saturn. It was discovered by Brett J. Gladman, et al. in 2000, and given the temporary designation S/2000 S 1.  It was named in August 2003 after Ymir, who in Norse mythology is the ancestor of all the Jotuns or frost giants.

It takes 3.6 Earth years to complete an orbit around Saturn.

Spectral measurements from Cassini–Huygens show that Ymir is reddish in color, unlike Phoebe's gray color, suggesting a separate origin for this moon. It shows a similar light curve as Siarnaq and has a triangular shape, rotating in a retrograde direction about once every 11.9 hours.

References

External links

 MPEC 2000-Y15: S/2000 S 1, S/2000 S 2, S/2000 S 7, S/2000 S 8, S/2000 S 9 (2000 Dec. 19 ephemeris)
 Ephemeris IAU-NSES
 Saturn's Known Satellites (by Scott S. Sheppard)
 Ymir website (by Tilmann Denk)

Astronomical objects discovered in 2000
Discoveries by Brett J. Gladman
Irregular satellites
Moons of Saturn
Norse group
Ymir
Moons with a retrograde orbit